The CMLL World Mini-Estrella Championship (Campeonato Mundial Mini-Estrella de CMLL in Spanish) is a professional wrestling championship promoted by the Mexican Lucha libre wrestling-based promotion Consejo Mundial de Lucha Libre (CMLL; Spanish for "World Wrestling Council"). The championship is exclusively competed for in the Mini-Estrellas, or Minis, division. A "Mini" is not necessarily a person with dwarfism, as in North American Midget wrestling; it can also be short wrestlers who work in the Mini-Estrellas division. The championship was created in 1992 and is the oldest active Mini-Estrella title in Mexico; both the Mexican National Mini-Estrella Championship and the Lucha Libre AAA Worldwide (AAA) World Mini-Estrella Championship were introduced after CMLL created their Mini-Estrella championship. As it is a professional wrestling championship, it is not won legitimately; it is instead won via a scripted ending to a match or awarded to a wrestler because of a storyline. All title matches take place under two out of three falls rules.

The CMLL World Mini-Estrella Championship was created in early 1992 to give CMLL's Mini-Estrellas division a championship as its focal point. The first champion was Mascarita Sagrada, who won a four-man tournament on March 1, 1992, by defeating Espectrito in the final. When the creator of CMLL's Minis division, Antonio Peña, left CMLL to form his own promotion, AAA, Mascarita Sagrada and many other Minis left CMLL to join AAA. After Mascarita Sagrada left the promotion, the title was vacant until September 1992, when Orito won the championship in a match against El Felinito. In 1999, in a so-called "Phantom title switch", then-champion Damiancito el Guerrero had the championship stripped and given to Último Dragoncito without a match taking place. Damiancito had begun working under the ring name "Virus" in the "regular-sized" division for more than a year and thus no longer qualified as a Mini. Instead of vacating the title or making Virus lose it in a match, CMLL announced that Último Dragoncito had "won" the title on an undisclosed date in October 1999.

In addition to being the first champion, Mascarita Sagrada is also the first wrestler to have vacated the title; he is also the wrestler to have held the title the shortest amount of time, at 110 days. Shockercito is the champion, having defeated Pierrothito on March 5, 2017, to win the vacant championship. On January 18, 2017, the previous champion, Astral, announced that he was moving into the regular sized division and thus had to give up the championship. Shockercito is the 14th overall champion in his first reign and he is the 12th person to hold the championship. Último Dragoncito and Pequeño Olímpico are the only wrestlers to hold the title twice, and Pequeño Olímpico has held the title the longest of any champion, at 1,442 days for a single reign and 2,744 for his combined two reigns.

1992 CMLL World Mini-Estrella tournament
CMLL held a tournament in early 1992 to determine the first CMLL World Mini-Estrella Champion; the semi-finals were held on February 23, 1992, and the finals on March 1, 1992.

Title history

Combined reigns
Key

Footnotes

References

Consejo Mundial de Lucha Libre championships
Midget wrestling championships
World professional wrestling championships